Kinyanjui is a surname of Kenyan origin. Notable people with the surname include:

Arthur Kinyanjui Magugu (1934–2012), Kenyan politician
Kui Kinyanjui, Kenyan reporter
Lee Kinyanjui (born 1972), Kenyan politician
Nephat Kinyanjui (born 1977), Kenyan long-distance runner
Kinyanjui Kombani (born 1981), Kenyan author

Kenyan names